John Dowland may refer to:

 John Dowland (1563–1626), English composer
 John Dowland (RAF officer) (1914–1942), recipient of the George Cross